Steve Jordan (born January 14, 1957) is an American musical director, producer, songwriter, and musician. During the 1970s and 1980s, he was a member of the bands for the television shows Saturday Night Live and Late Night with David Letterman.

In the early 1980s, Jordan was a member of the band "Eye Witness", along with Anthony Jackson on bass, and Manolo Badrena on percussion. Since the mid 1980s, Jordan has also been a member of the X-Pensive Winos, the side project of Rolling Stones guitarist Keith Richards. Jordan and Richards have been production and songwriting partners on many of Richards's solo works. In 2005, he became a member of the John Mayer Trio. Jordan also formed the band "The Verbs", which he fronts, with his wife Meegan Voss. On August 5, 2021, it was reported that Charlie Watts had elected to sit out the resumption of the US No Filter Tour due to a heart procedure surgery and that Jordan would temporarily replace him on drums. Following Watts' death, he has played with the Stones both live and in studio.

Early years
Jordan attended New York City's High School of Music and Art, graduating in 1974.

Jordan was a teenager when he became an honorary member of Stevie Wonder’s band "WonderLove". He also was a substitute drummer in the band "Stuff" in 1976  and played with Joe Cocker on his American tour. Later, he played drums for the Saturday Night Live band in the 1970s. When John Belushi and Dan Aykroyd toured as The Blues Brothers in the late 1970s, Jordan was their drummer, and recorded on their resulting albums, credited as Steve "Getdwa" Jordan. He did not, however, appear in the movie of the same name. Jordan also played in the New York "24th Street Band" with  Will Lee, Clifford Carter, and Hiram Bullock which later became Paul Shaffer and the World's Most Dangerous Band, which played on Late Night with David Letterman from 1982 to 1986.

X-Pensive Winos and Chuck Berry 
Jordan, along with fellow Shaffer alumnus Anton Fig, appeared on the Rolling Stones' 1986 release Dirty Work, playing percussion, not drums, contrary to rumors. Keith Richards then hired Jordan to play on Aretha Franklin's cover of "Jumpin' Jack Flash" for a film of the same name.

According to Richards, Jordan kept asking Richards on the plane ride home from the recording session with Franklin in Detroit, to be included in the upcoming documentary by Taylor Hackford Hail! Hail! Rock 'n' Roll, a tribute to Chuck Berry. Richards had been hoping to include Charlie Watts in the project but when this proved unfeasible, Jordan was hired and he appeared in many scenes with Berry and Richards. The success of this project led to Jordan's membership in Keith Richards and the X-pensive Winos, a band that toured and recorded three albums, Talk is Cheap (1988), Main Offender (1992), and Crosseyed Heart (2015). Jordan co-produced all three albums and is credited with songwriting, along with Richards. One of these collaborations made it onto the Billboard Hot 100 via the Rolling Stones Steel Wheels album version in 1989: "Almost Hear You Sigh" peaked at number 50 (U.S.) and 31 (U.K.) in December of that year.

The Verbs 
Jordan formed a band with his wife, Meegan Voss, who fronted the all-girl punk bands the PopTarts and the Antoinettes, and they have toured and recorded under the band name the Verbs. They toured Japan in 2007 in support of their first release, And Now... The Verbs. They followed their debut album with Trip, the next release by Jordan and Voss. As in their previous release, this album features Tamio Okuda on lead guitars, Pino Palladino on bass and additional classic guitar work by Danny "Kootch" Kortchmar.

Producing and performance career 
Jordan has recorded with such artists as Don Henley, John Mellencamp, Andrés Calamaro, Cat Stevens, Bob Dylan, Sonny Rollins, B.B. King, Stevie Nicks, Sheryl Crow, Neil Young, Jon Spencer Blues Explosion, Kelly Clarkson, and many more. He is featured on James Taylor's 1998 DVD, Live at the Beacon Theatre.

Jordan is a Grammy Award-winning and nominated producer with Robert Cray's album Take Your Shoes Off and Buddy Guy's Bring 'Em In, respectively. He has played on Alicia Keys' "If I Ain't Got You" and Bruce Springsteen's Devils and Dust, and he produced the Grammy Award-winning John Mayer album Continuum (2006), John Scofield's That's What I Say, Possibilities by Herbie Hancock, and 23rd St. Lullaby and Play It As It Lays with Patti Scialfa.

Jordan is interviewed on screen, was a musical director, led the house band and appears in performance footage in the 2005 documentary film Make It Funky!, which presents a history of New Orleans music and its influence on rhythm and blues, rock and roll, funk and jazz.

In 2006, Jordan joined Eric Clapton's touring band for Clapton's "European Tour 2006", which included seven sold-out shows at the Royal Albert Hall. He continued in Clapton's band as they toured North America in 2007.

In 2008, Jordan produced and played percussion on one track for Los Lonely Boys' third album, Forgiven, at East Side Stages in Austin, Texas.

In 2009, Jordan received another Grammy Award nomination - the Grammy Award for Best Compilation Soundtrack Album for a Motion Picture, Television or Other Visual Media, for his work on the soundtrack scoring film for the movie Cadillac Records.

In 2013, Jordan produced the Boz Scaggs album Memphis.

John Mayer Trio 
Jordan is a member of the John Mayer Trio, a blues rock power trio that consists of Jordan, on drums and backing vocals, bassist Pino Palladino and guitarist-singer John Mayer. The group was formed in 2005 by Mayer as a deviation from his pop-acoustic career. The trio released the record Try! on November 22, 2005. The 11-track live album includes cover songs, such as Jimi Hendrix's "Wait Until Tomorrow", and "I Got a Woman" by Ray Charles, two songs from Mayer's release Heavier Things, as well as new songs written by Mayer, in addition to three songs written by Jordan, Mayer, and Palladino. They are: "Good Love Is On the Way", "Vultures" and "Try". Jordan and Mayer also produced the album together on the Columbia Records label.

The trio also performed on December 8, 2007, in Los Angeles, California at the L.A. Live Nokia Theatre for the 1st Annual Holiday Charity Revue, which raised funds for various Los Angeles related charities. The DVD/CD release, entitled Where the Light Is: John Mayer Live in Los Angeles features Palladino on bass and Jordan on drums.

Jordan would later collaborate with Mayer and Charlie Hunter by writing "In Repair", the 11th track from Mayer's 2006 album Continuum. Jordan also contributed to Mayer's fourth album, Battle Studies; videos of the conceptual/recording sessions can be viewed on YouTube.

Super Soul Band 
Jordan also belongs to an all-star funk group, that "is redefining the idea of a supergroup." The band consists of Jordan on the drums, Wayne Cobham, Eddie Allen, Clifton Anderson, and Clark Gayton on the horn section. Willie Weeks on bass, Mix Master Mike, Isaiah Sharkey, and Ray Parker Jr. on guitar.

The Rolling Stones 
On August 5, 2021, it was announced that Jordan would replace Rolling Stones drummer Charlie Watts on the Stones' 13-date US tour. Watts was first sidelined for health problems and died on August 24, 2021, at the age of 80 after a short illness. Richards recounted in his 2010 autobiography that in the 1980s Watts told him that if he ever wanted to work with another drummer, "Steve Jordan’s your man."

Discography

With The Blues Brothers
 Briefcase Full of Blues, 1978
 Made in America, 1980
 Best of the Blues Brothers, 1981
 Dancin' Wid Da Blues Brothers, 1983
 Everybody Needs the Blues Brothers, 1988
 The Definitive Collection, 1992
 The Very Best of The Blues Brothers, 1995
 The Blues Brothers Complete, 2000
 The Essentials, 2003

As sideman
 
With Casey Abrams
 Casey Abrams (Concord, 2012)
With Patti Austin
 Havana Candy (CTI, 1977)
With George Benson
 In Your Eyes (Warner Bros. Records, 1983)
With Beyoncé
 I Am... Sasha Fierce (Columbia Records, 2008)
With Booker T. & the M.G.'s
 That's The Way It Should Be (Columbia, 1994)
With Ronnie Baker Brooks
 Times Have Changed (Provogue, 2017)
With Solomon Burke
 Like a Fire (Shout! Factory, 2008)
With Andrés Calamaro
 Alta Suciedad (Gasa, 1997)
With J. J. Cale and Eric Clapton 
 The Road to Escondido (Reprise Records, 2006)
With Felix Cavaliere
 Castles in the Air (Epic, 1979)
With Kelly Clarkson
 Stronger (RCA Records, 2011)
With Sean Costello
 Sean Costello (Tone-Cool Records, 2004)
With Cracker
 Gentleman's Blues (Virgin Records, 1998)
With Robert Cray
 Take Your Shoes Off (Rykodisc, 1999)
 Shoulda Been Home (Rykodisc, 2001)
 In My Soul (Provogue, 2014)
 Robert Cray & Hi Rhythm (Warner Bros., 2017)
 That's What I Heard (Nozzle, 2020)
With Steve Cropper
 Dedicated – A Salute to the 5 Royales (429 Records, 2011)
With Sheryl Crow
 C'mon, C'mon (A&M Records, 2002)
 Threads (Big Machine Records, 2019)
With Bob Dylan
 Down in the Groove (Columbia Records, 1988)
With Donald Fagen
 The Nightfly (Warner Bros. Records, 1982)
With Ricky Fanté
 Rewind (Virgin, 2004)
With Roberta Flack
 Roberta (Atlantic Records, 1994)
With Robben Ford
 Tiger Walk (Blue Thumb, 1997)
With Bernard Fowler
 Inside Out (Rhyme & Reason, 2019)
With Aretha Franklin
 Aretha (Arista Records, 1986)
With Michael Franks
 The Camera Never Lies (Warner Bros. Records, 1987)
With Jeffrey Gaines
 Somewhat Slightly Dazed (Chrysalis Records, 1994)
With Bee Gees
 Still Waters (Polydor Records, 1997)
With Debbie Gibson
 Think with Your Heart (EMI, 1995)
With Vince Gill
 Down to My Last Bad Habit (MCA Records, 2016)
With Bunky Green
 Visions (Vanguard, 1978)
With Josh Groban
 Bridges (Reprise Records, 2018)
 Harmony (Reprise Records, 2020)
With Hall & Oates
 Our Kind of Soul (U-Watch Records, 2004)
With Herbie Hancock
 Possibilities (Hear Music, 2005)
With Major Harris
 How Do You Take Your Love (RCA Records, 1978)
With Don Henley
 The End of the Innocence (Geffen, 1989)
With Cissy Houston
 Cissy Houston (Private Stock Records, 1977)
 Face to Face (BMG, 1996)
 He Leadeth Me (A&M Records, 1997)
With Garland Jeffreys
 Don't Call Me Buckwheat (BMG, 1991)
 Wildlife Dictionary (RCA Records, 1997)
 The King of In Between (Big Lake, 2011)
 Truth Serum (Luna Park, 2013)
With Billy Joel
 River of Dreams (Columbia Records, 1993)
With Libby Johnson
 Annabella (Wrong Records, 2006)
With Alicia Keys
 The Diary of Alicia Keys (J Records, 2003)
 As I Am (J Records, 2007)
 Keys (RCA Records, 2021)
With Steve Khan Eyewitness
 Eyewitness (Antilles, 1981)
 Modern Times (also released as Blades) (Trio/Passport, 1982)
 Casa Loco (Antilles, 1984)
With B.B. King
 Deuces Wild (MCA Records, 1997)
With K'naan
 Country, God or the Girl (A&M Records, 2012)
With Labelle
 Back to Now (Verve, 2008)
With Cyndi Lauper
 At Last (Epic Records, 2003)
With Bettye LaVette
 Things Have Changed (Verve, 2018)
 Blackbirds (Verve, 2020)
With Lori Lieberman
 Letting Go (Millennium Records, 1978)
With Taj Mahal
 Evolution (The Most Recent) (Warner Bros., 1978)
With Ziggy Marley
 Dragonfly (Private Music, 2003)
With Amanda Marshall
 Tuesday's Child (Epic Records, 1999)
With Bruno Mars
 Unorthodox Jukebox (Atlantic Records, 2012)
With John Mayer 
 Heavier Things (Columbia, 2003)
 Continuum (Columbia, 2006)
 Battle Studies (Columbia, 2009)
 The Search for Everything (Columbia, 2017)
With John Mayer Trio
 Try! (Columbia, 2005)
With Melanie
 Phonogenic – Not Just Another Pretty Face (Midsong International, 1978)
With John Mellencamp
 Cuttin' Heads (Columbia Records, 2001)
With Keb' Mo'
 The Door (Epic Records, 2000)
 BLUESAmericana (Kind of Blue Music, 2014)
 Moonlight, Mistletoe & You (Concord Records, 2019)
With Ivan Neville
 If My Ancestors Could See Me Now (Polydor Records, 1988)
 Thanks (Iguana Records, 1995)
With The Neville Brothers
 Brother's Keeper (A&M, 1990)
With Stevie Nicks
 Rock a Little (Parlophone Records, 1985)
With Odyssey
 Hollywood Party Tonight (RCA Victor, 1978)
With David Paich
 Forgotten Toys (The Players Club, 2022)
With Sam Phillips
 The Indescribable Wow (Virgin Records, 1988)
With The Pretenders
 Get Close (Real, 1986)
With Don Pullen
 Montreux Concert (Atlantic, 1977)
With Nicole Renée
 Nicole Renée (Atlantic Records, 1998)
With Keith Richards
 Talk Is Cheap (Virgin, 1988)
 Main Offender (Virgin, 1992)
 Crosseyed Heart (Republic, 2015)
With LeAnn Rimes
 Spitfire (Curb Records, 2013)
 One Christmas: Chapter 1 (Iconic Records, 2014)
 Remnants (RCA Records, 2016)
With Mark Ronson
 Uptown Special (Columbia Records, 2015)
With Boz Scaggs
 Dig (Virgin Records, 2001)
 Memphis (429 Records, 2013)
 A Fool to Care (429 Records, 2015)
With Helen Schneider
 Let It Be Now (RCA Records, 1978)
With Patti Scialfa
 23rd Street Lullaby (Columbia, 2004)
 Play It as It Lays (Columbia, 2007)
With John Scofield
 Who's Who? (Arista, 1979)
 Electric Outlet (Gramavision, 1984)
 That's What I Say: John Scofield Plays the Music of Ray Charles (Verve Records, 2005)
With John Sebastian
 Tar Beach (Shanachie, 1992)
With Brian Setzer
 The Knife Feels Like Justice (EMI, 1986)
With Feargal Sharkey
 Wish (Virgin Records, 1988)
With Bruce Springsteen
 Devils & Dust (Columbia Records, 2005)
 Wrecking Ball (Columbia Records, 2012)
With Candi Staton
 Chance (Warner Bros. Records, 1979)
With Mike Stern
 Upside Downside (Atlantic, 1986)
With Cat Stevens
 Back to Earth (Island Records, 1978)
With Rod Stewart
 Soulbook (J Records, 2009)
With Andrew Strong
 Strong (MCA Records, 1993)
With James Taylor
 New Moon Shine (Columbia Records, 1991)
With Toto
 Fahrenheit (CBS, 1986)
With Bonnie Tyler
 Faster Than the Speed of Night (Columbia Records, 1983)
With Neil Young
 Landing on Water (Geffen, 1986)
With Steven Van Zandt
 Freedom – No Compromise (EMI, 1987)

Equipment
Jordan plays Yamaha Drums, Paiste Cymbals and Remo drumheads. He has signature drumsticks from Vic Firth.

Acoustic Drums:Yamaha Maple Custom
 14" x 6.5" snare drum or a 13" x 6.5" Steve Jordan Signature snare drum
 20" x 16" bass drum
 12" x 8" rack tom
 14" x 14" floor tom

Paiste:
 17" Signature Traditionals Thin Crash (as hi-hat top)
 17" Signature Dark Energy Crash (as hi-hat bottom)
 20" Masters Dark Crash Ride
 22" Traditionals Light Ride

Drumheads:
Jordan endorses Remo drumheads and uses Coated Vintage A's and Coated Ambassadors on the toms and snares and either a Coated Powerstroke 3 or a Coated Ambassador on the bass drum.

Drumsticks:
"Steve's Signature stick is light and long for great touch and sound around the drums and cymbals." In hickory. L = 16 ½"; Dia. = .525" Jordan discussed their use in a video interview for Vic Firth.

References

External links 

Steve Jordan video interview

Living people
African-American drummers
The High School of Music & Art alumni
Musicians from New York City
American rock drummers
African-American record producers
American session musicians
Paul Shaffer and the World's Most Dangerous Band members
The Blues Brothers members
American funk drummers
American male drummers
1957 births
American rhythm and blues musicians
American jazz drummers
American blues drummers
American soul musicians
Booker T. & the M.G.'s members
Grammy Award winners
American multi-instrumentalists
Record producers from New York (state)
Rhythm and blues drummers
Soul drummers
John Mayer Trio members
20th-century American drummers
Saturday Night Live Band members
Jazz musicians from New York (state)
American male jazz musicians
Primetime Emmy Award winners